Bullard Tavern, or simply Bullard, is a restaurant in Portland, Oregon.

Description and history 
Doug Adams' plans to open Bullard in downtown Portland's Woodlark Hotel were announced in 2016. The restaurant, named after his hometown in East Texas, opened in December 2018. Brooke Jackson-Glidden of Eater Portland described Bullard as "a meat restaurant, with some vegetables, a handful of fish dishes, but overarchingly, tons of methodically selected cuts of local beef, pork, and lamb". The restaurant began serving brunch in 2019.

Reception

In 2019, Bullard was a Design of the Year finalist in Eater Portland's annual Eater Awards. The website's Daniel Barnett included the restaurant in a 2020 list of the city's 10 "buzziest new breakfasts and brunches". Jackson-Glidden included Bullard in a 2020 overview of "Where to Throw a Bachelorette Party in Portland", and Nick Woo included the restaurant in a 2020 list of "14 Outstanding Fried Chicken Sandwiches in Portland". The business was included in Eater Portland's 2022 overview of "Where to Eat and Drink in Downtown Portland".

Jordan Michelman of Portland Monthly included Bullard in a 2022 list of the Portland area's "very best" chicken wings.

References

External links

 
 

2018 establishments in Oregon
Restaurants established in 2018
Restaurants in Portland, Oregon
Southwest Portland, Oregon